Edmund Gwenn (born Edmund John Kellaway; 26 September 1877 – 6 September 1959) was an English actor. On film, he is best remembered for his role as Kris Kringle in the Christmas film Miracle on 34th Street (1947), for which he won the Academy Award for Best Supporting Actor and the corresponding Golden Globe Award. He received a second Golden Globe and another Academy Award nomination for the comedy film Mister 880 (1950). He is also remembered for his appearances in four films directed by Alfred Hitchcock.

As a stage actor in the West End and on Broadway, he was associated with a wide range of works by modern playwrights, including Bernard Shaw, John Galsworthy and J. B. Priestley. After the Second World War, he lived in the United States, where he had a successful career in Hollywood and Broadway.

Life and career

Early years
Gwenn was born in Wandsworth, London to John and Catherine ( Oliver) Kellaway. His brother was the actor Arthur Chesney, and his cousin was the actor Cecil Kellaway. Gwenn was educated at St. Olave's School and later at King's College London. He began his acting career in the theatre in 1895, and learned his craft as a member of Willie Edouin's company, playing brash comic roles. In 1901 he married Minnie Terry, niece of Dame Ellen Terry. In the same year, he went to Australia and acted there for three years with the J. C. Williamson company. His wife accompanied him, and when Gwenn was in a production of Ben Hur that was a disastrous failure, she restored the couple's fortunes by accepting an engagement from Williamson. Later, the couple appeared on stage together in London in a farce called What the Butler Saw in 1905 and, in 1911, when Irene Vanbrugh made her debut in variety, she chose Terry and Gwenn to join her in a short play specially written by J. M. Barrie.

When he returned to London, Gwenn appeared not in low comedy but in what The Times called "a notably intellectual and even sophisticated setting" at the Court Theatre under the management of J. E. Vedrenne and Harley Granville-Barker. There, in 1905 to 1907, in the words of The Times, "he was invaluable in smaller parts [giving] every part he played its full worth", including Straker, the proletarian chauffeur to John Tanner in Bernard Shaw's Man and Superman, and Drinkwater, the cockney gangster in Captain Brassbound's Conversion. He also appeared in plays by Granville-Barker and John Galsworthy, in Elizabeth Robins's suffragette drama Votes for Women and in works by other contemporaries. In Barrie's What Every Woman Knows (1908) in the role of the over-enthusiastic James Wylie he impressed the producer Charles Frohman, who engaged him for his repertory company at the Duke of York's Theatre. In 1912, Gwenn went into management in partnership with Hilda Trevelyan. His career was interrupted by his military service during the First World War, serving as an officer in the British Army. During the war, Gwenn's marriage broke up and was dissolved. His ex-wife remarried but remained on affectionate terms with him.

Leading roles on stage and screen
After peace returned, Gwenn's leading roles in the West End during the 1920s included Old Bill in Bruce Bairnsfather's Old Bill, M.P. (1922); Christian Veit in Lilac Time (1922–23); the title role in A. A. Milne's The Great Broxoff (1923); Leo Swinburne in Good Luck by Seymour Hicks and Ian Hay (1923); and Hippolyte Gallipot in Lehár's Frasquita (1925). Looking back at Gwenn's career, The Times considered, "Out of scores of other parts which he played in England and in America, the best remembered are probably Hornblower in Galsworthy's The Skin Game, the Viennese paterfamilias in Lilac Time and Samuel Pepys in Fagan's And So to Bed in 1926."

Gwenn began his film career in 1916, playing Macbeth in The Real Thing at Last, a satire of the American film industry written by Peter Pan playwright J. M. Barrie. A notable early role was a recreation of his stage character Hornblower in the 1921 Anglo-Dutch silent film of The Skin Game, which he reprised ten years later in Alfred Hitchcock's early sound version of The Skin Game. His debut in a talking picture was in an adaptation of Shaw's How He Lied to Her Husband, made at Elstree in 1931. Of Gwenn's many British film roles, The Times considered his best known to be Jess Oakroyd in The Good Companions with John Gielgud and Jessie Matthews (1933) and Radfern in Carol Reed's Laburnum Grove with Cedric Hardwicke (1936). His final British film role, as a capitalist trying to take over a family brewery in Cheer Boys Cheer (1939) is credited with being the first authentic Ealing comedy.

Gwenn appeared in more than eighty films, including Pride and Prejudice (1940), Cheers for Miss Bishop, Of Human Bondage and The Keys of the Kingdom. George Cukor's  Sylvia Scarlett (1935) was his first appearance in a Hollywood film, as Katharine Hepburn's father. He settled in Hollywood in 1940 and became part of its British colony. He had a small role as a Cockney assassin in a Hitchcock film, Foreign Correspondent in 1940. For his Santa Claus role in Miracle on 34th Street he won an Academy Award for Best Supporting Actor. He received a second Oscar nomination for his role in Mister 880 (1950). Near the end of his career, he played one of the main roles in Them! (1954) and in Hitchcock's The Trouble with Harry (1955).

On Broadway Gwenn starred in the acclaimed 1942 production of Chekhov's Three Sisters, starring Katharine Cornell (who was also the producer), Judith Anderson, and Ruth Gordon. Time proclaimed it, "a dream production by anybody's reckoning – the most glittering cast the theatre has seen, commercially, in this generation."

Later years
Gwenn remained a British subject all his life. When he first moved to Hollywood, he lived at the Beverly Wilshire Hotel in Beverly Hills. His home in London had been reduced to rubble during the bombings by the German Luftwaffe in the Second World War. Only the fireplace survived. What Gwenn regretted most was the loss of the memorabilia he had collected of the actor Henry Irving. Eventually, Gwenn bought a house at 617 North Bedford Drive in Beverly Hills, which he later shared with the former Olympic athlete Rodney Soher. At the age of 78 he travelled from his home in California for a reunion with his ex-wife in London. He told a reporter, "I never married again because I was very happy with my wife. I simply stayed faithful to the memory of that happiness."

Gwenn died from pneumonia after suffering a stroke, in Woodland Hills, California, twenty days before his 82nd birthday. He was cremated, and his ashes were placed in the vault at the Chapel of the Pines Crematory in Los Angeles. Gwenn has a star on the Hollywood Walk of Fame at 1751 Vine Street for his contribution to motion pictures.

Filmography

 The Real Thing at Last (1916) as Rupert K. Thunder / Macbeth
 Unmarried (1920) as Simm Vandeleur
 The Skin Game (1921) as Hornblower
 How He Lied to Her Husband (1931) as Teddy Bompas
 The Skin Game (1931) as Mr. Hornblower
 Hindle Wakes (1931) as Chris Hawthorne
 Frail Women (1932) as The Bookmaker - Jim Willis
 Money for Nothing (1932) as Sir Henry Blossom
 Condemned to Death (1932) as Banting
 Love on Wheels (1932) as Philpotts
 Tell Me Tonight (1932) as Mayor Pategg
 The Good Companions (1933) as Jess Oakroyd
 Cash (1933) as Edmund Gilbert
 I Was a Spy (1933) as Burgomaster
 Smithy (1933) as John Smith
 Channel Crossing (1933) as Trotter
 Marooned (1933) as Tom Roberts
 Friday the Thirteenth (1933) as Mr Wakefield
 Early to Bed (1933) as Kruger
 Waltzes from Vienna (1934) as Johann Strauss, the Elder
 Warn London (1934) as Dr. Herman Krauss
 Passing Shadows (1934) as David Lawrence
 Java Head (1934) as Jeremy Ammidon
 The Admiral's Secret (1934) as Adm. Fitzporter
 Father and Son (1934) as John Bolton
 Spring in the Air (1934) as Franz
 The Bishop Misbehaves (1935) as Bishop
 Sylvia Scarlett (1935) as Henry Scarlett
 The Walking Dead (1936) as Dr. Beaumont
 Laburnum Grove (1936) as Mr. Radfern
 Anthony Adverse (1936) as John Bonnyfeather
 All American Chump (1936) as Jeffrey Crane
 Mad Holiday (1936) as Williams
 Parnell (1937) as Campbell
 South Riding (1938) as Alfred Huggins
 A Yank at Oxford (1938) as Dean of Cardinal
 Penny Paradise (1938) as Joe Higgins
 Cheer Boys Cheer (1939) as Edward Ironside
 The Earl of Chicago (1940) as Munsey, the Butler
 An Englishman's Home (1940) as Tom Brown
 The Doctor Takes a Wife (1940) as Dr. Lionel Sterling
 Pride and Prejudice (1940) as Mr. Bennet
 Foreign Correspondent (1940) as Rowley
 Cheers for Miss Bishop (1941) as President Corcoran
 Scotland Yard (1941) as Insp. Cork
 The Devil and Miss Jones (1941) as Hooper 
 One Night in Lisbon (1941) as Lord Fitzleigh
 Charley's Aunt (1941) as Stephen Spettigue
 A Yank at Eton (1942) as Headmaster Justin
 Forever and a Day (1943) as Stubbs
 The Meanest Man in the World (1943) as Frederick P. Leggitt
 Lassie Come Home (1943) as Rowlie
 Between Two Worlds (1944) as Scrubby
 The Keys of the Kingdom (1944) as Father Hamish MacNabb
 Dangerous Partners (1945) as Albert Richard Kingby
 Bewitched (1945) as Dr. Bergson
 She Went to the Races (1945) as Dr. Homer Pecke
 Of Human Bondage (1946) as Athelny
 Undercurrent (1946) as Prof. 'Dink' Hamilton
 Miracle on 34th Street (1947) as Kris Kringle
 Life with Father (1947) as Rev. Dr. Lloyd
 Thunder in the Valley (1947) as Adam MacAdam
 Green Dolphin Street (1947) as Octavius Patourel
 Apartment for Peggy (1948) as Prof. Henry Barnes
 Hills of Home (1948) as Dr. William MacLure
 Challenge to Lassie (1949) as John Traill
 A Woman of Distinction (1950) as Mark 'J.M.' Middlecott
 Louisa (1950) as Henry Hammond
 Pretty Baby (1950) as Cyrus Baxter
 Mister 880 (1950) as William 'Skipper' Miller
 For Heaven's Sake (1950) as Arthur
 Peking Express (1951) as Father Joseph Murray
 Sally and Saint Anne (1952) as Grandpa Pat Ryan
 Les Misérables (1952) as Bishop Courbet
 Bonzo Goes to College (1952) as Ted 'Pop' Drew
 Something for the Birds (1952) as 'Admiral' Johnnie Adams
 Mister Scoutmaster (1953) as Dr. Stone
 The Bigamist (1953) as Mr. Jordan
 The Student Prince (1954) as Prof. Juttner
 Them! (1954) as Dr. Harold Medford
 The Trouble with Harry (1955) as Capt. Albert Wiles
 It's a Dog's Life (1955) as Jeremiah Edward Emmett Augustus Nolan
 Calabuch (1956, U.S. title The Rocket from Calabuch) as Prof. Jorge Serra Hamilton

Radio appearances

Audition program for the Suspense radio program.

See also
 List of actors with Academy Award nominations

Notes

References

Further reading

External links

 
 
 Edmund Gwenn in Screen Director's Playhouse: Miracle on 34th Street (1949) (Downloadable mp3 and streaming audio)
 Edmund Gwenn in Lux Radio Theater: Miracle on 34th Street (1948) (Downloadable mp3 and streaming audio)
 Regarding Edmund Gwenn (TCM Movie Morlocks)

1877 births
1959 deaths
20th-century English male actors
People educated at St Olave's Grammar School
Alumni of King's College London
Best Supporting Actor Academy Award winners
Best Supporting Actor Golden Globe (film) winners
Burials at Chapel of the Pines Crematory
British emigrants to the United States
English male film actors
English male silent film actors
English male stage actors
Male actors from London
People from Wandsworth
Terry family
British Army personnel of World War I
Royal Army Service Corps officers
Deaths from pneumonia in California